Marcinkowo Górne  is a village in the administrative district of Gmina Gąsawa, within Żnin County, Kuyavian-Pomeranian Voivodeship, in north-central Poland.

On 24 November 1227 High Duke of Poland Leszek the White was assassinated here. This incident is commemorated with a statue of Leszek hit by an arrow.

References

Villages in Żnin County